The 1970–71 FIBA Women's European Champions Cup was the twelfth edition of FIBA Europe's competition for women's basketball national champion clubs, running from November 1970 to April 1971.

France's Clermont UC became the first team from the Western Bloc to reach the competition's final, defeating 1970 runner-up Wisła Kraków in the semifinals, but it wasn't able to end the Soviet hegemony, with Daugava Riga winning its eighth title in a row. Turkey withdrew from the competition for sanitary reasons.

Qualifying round

Round of 10

Group stage

Group A

Group B

Semifinals

Finals

References

Champions Cup
European
European
EuroLeague Women seasons